J. D. King is an American artist best known for his commercial art illustrations for companies including Absolut Vodka, Atlantic Records, Condé Nast Publications, Sony, and others.

Biography
J. D. King began his career in the late 1970s with contributions to underground press magazines such as Stop!, Weirdo, and Comical Funnies.

King's illustrations have appeared in The Boston Globe, The New York Times, The Wall Street Journal and The Washington Post. In addition to book illustration (Martin McIntosh's Beatsville), he has contributed to numerous magazines, including Adweek, US Postal Service, Audubon magazine, BusinessWeek, Entertainment Weekly, Fortune, Women's Wear Daily, The Smithsonian magazine, New York, The New Yorker, Princeton Alumni Weekly, California magazine, and Time. Beastniks, a comic strip inspired by beatniks, ran in Drawn & Quarterly and Twist during the late 1980s and early 1990s.

J.J. Sedelmaier Productions animated King's eccentric cartoon characters for a Nick@Nite promotional film, and Curious Pictures also animated King's creations for a U.S. Cellular phone commercial.

His artwork has been displayed in awards annuals, including American Illustration, Communication Arts and the annual of the Society of Publication Designers. He authored the Foreword for The Curiously Sinister Art of Jim Flora (Fantagraphics Books, 2007).

King is also a guitarist. His band, J. D. King and the Coachmen, recorded Ten Compositions: New Frontiers in Free Rock  and American Mercury.

Footnotes

External links
 

American cartoonists
Place of birth missing (living people)
Year of birth missing (living people)
American magazine illustrators
Living people